Laos competed at the 1988 Summer Olympics in Seoul, South Korea.
The nation returned to the Olympic Games after being part of the Soviet-led boycott of the 1984 Summer Olympics.

Competitors
The following is the list of number of competitors in the Games.

Athletics

Women

Track events

Boxing

References

Official Olympic Reports

Nations at the 1988 Summer Olympics
1988
1988 in Laotian sport